Karen Beckman (Bridge) (1960 – June 2020) was a female badminton player of England.

Career
She won a bronze medals at the 1980 IBF World Championships in women's doubles with Barbara Sutton.

She represented England and won a gold medal in the team event, at the 1978 Commonwealth Games in Edmonton, Alberta, Canada. In addition she reached the quarter finals of the doubles and mixed doubles.

Four years later, as Karen Beckman she represented England and won a gold medal in the team event and two silver medals in the women's doubles and mixed doubles, at the 1982 Commonwealth Games in Brisbane, Queensland, Australia. The mixed doubles medal was with her brother, Duncan Bridge.

Personal life
She was a coach for the Wilson Boys' School's badminton team and a part-time coach for the Wimbledon Racquets and Fitness Club's junior badminton team towards the end of her life.

She has a son, Ben Beckman, who has also successfully played badminton for England.

Beckman died of cancer in June 2020.

References

European results
English statistics

English female badminton players
1960 births
2020 deaths
Deaths from cancer in England
Badminton players at the 1978 Commonwealth Games
Commonwealth Games medallists in badminton
Commonwealth Games gold medallists for England
Commonwealth Games silver medallists for England
20th-century English women
Medallists at the 1978 Commonwealth Games
Medallists at the 1982 Commonwealth Games